The 1988 NCAA Division I women's soccer tournament was the seventh annual single-elimination tournament to determine the national champion of NCAA Division I women's collegiate soccer. This was the first championship for just Division I programs. The championship game was played again at Fetzer Field in Chapel Hill, North Carolina during December 1988.

North Carolina defeated rival NC State in the final, 4–1, to win their sixth national title. Coached by Anson Dorrance, the Tar Heels finished the season 18–0–3. This would go on to become the third of North Carolina's record nine consecutive national titles (1986–1994). It was also part of the Tar Heels' ten-year unbeaten streak that ran from the 1984 championship game all the way until the 1994 season.

The most outstanding offensive player was Shannon Higgins from North Carolina, and the most outstanding defensive player was Carla Werden, also from North Carolina. Higgins was also the tournament's leading scorer (4 goals, 1 assist).

Qualification

After the establishment of the NCAA Division II Women's Soccer Championship in 1988, only Division I women's soccer programs were eligible to qualify for the tournament. Nonetheless, the tournament field remained fixed at 12 teams.

Bracket

See also 
 NCAA Division I women's soccer championship
 NCAA Division II Women's Soccer Championship (began 1988)
 NCAA Division III Women's Soccer Championship
 1988 NCAA Division I Men's Soccer Championship

References

NCAA
NCAA Women's Soccer Championship
 
NCAA Division I Women's Soccer Tournament
NCAA Division I Women's Soccer Tournament